The  was a mountain gun used as a general-purpose infantry support gun by the Imperial Japanese Army during the Second Sino-Japanese War and World War II. It superseded the Type 41 75 mm mountain gun to become the standard pack artillery piece of Japanese infantry divisions. It was superior to the Type 41 in range and in weight. The Type 94 number was designated for the year the gun was accepted, 2594 in the Japanese imperial year calendar, or 1934 in the Gregorian calendar.

History and development
Combat experience with the Type 41 mountain gun during the invasion of Manchuria indicated to the Imperial Japanese Army General Staff that the existing primary mountain gun lacked not only in firepower and accuracy, but also was not as easily transportable under difficult terrain as had been hoped. The army technical bureau was assigned a project to develop a replacement in 1931. The first prototype was tested in 1932, and the design released for production by September 1934 as the "Type 94". However, plans to re-equip all artillery regiments with the new weapon were continually postponed due to budgetary priorities.

Design

The Type 94 75 mm mountain gun had a single-piece gun barrel with a sliding breechblock based on German Krupp designs, and a long split-trail carriage with spade plates for stabilizers with a hydro-pneumatic recoil mechanism based on French Schneider designs. The crew was partially protected by a gun shield made of 1/8-inch (3 mm) thick armor plate. It had pintle traverse, and an equalizing arrangement which gave it three-point suspension. Since it was trunnioned at the center of balance, it did not require equilibrators. It could be fired with trails closed or open.

The gun could be broken down into eleven pack loads within three to five minutes for transport by animals or men. The heaviest component weighed 210 pounds (95 kg), and the weapon was intended to be transported by six pack horses, or 18 men (although during the Bougainville campaign of 1943–1945 it was carried by 41 men because of the extremely difficult terrain on Bougainville). In daylight, the gun could be reassembled within 10 minutes and disassembled in from three to five minutes. The tasks also could be performed at night after the parts were rubbed with luminous bark, but took five to 10 minutes longer.

The gun fired the same projectiles as other 75 mm pieces and had a cartridge case identical in length with that used in the Type 38 75 mm field gun. This case was longer than that used in the Type 41 mountain gun because the propelling charge used in Model 94 ammunition was less than that used in the ammunition for the Type 38, and firing the Type 38's ammunition from the Type 94 would damage the gun. The Type 38 lacked both a howitzer trajectory and varying charges with which to adjust the trajectory of rounds it fired, and this increased the dead space for the Model 94 when it fired in mountainous terrain. The Type 94's counterrecoil was said to be so slow when the piece was fired at elevations above 30° that, rather than fire above that elevation, the artillery battery displaced forward to maintain a higher rate of fire.

Ammunition
 High-explosive
 "A"  with picric acid and dinitro and M3 combination fuse
 M90 pointed HE  with TNT and M88 impact or delay fuse
 Armor-piercing
 Shrapnel
 Chemical
 Star
 M90 illumination  with M5 combination fuse
 Incendiary
 M90 incendiary  with black powder and M5 combination fuse
 Smoke

Combat record
Type 94 75 mm mountain gun was used extensively in Manchukuo during the Pacification of Manchukuo (1931–1942) and in China during the Second Sino-Japanese War (1937–1945). It was also assigned to units in the Southern Expeditionary Army and was sited in defensive positions on islands throughout the Netherlands East Indies and the South Seas Mandate. It was one of the most common weapons encountered by Allied forces in the closing stages of World War II.

Both North Korea′s Korean People's Army and the People's Republic of China′s People's Volunteer Army used Chinese copies of the Type 94 during the Korean War (1950–1953).

Notes

References
 Bishop, Chris (eds) The Encyclopedia of Weapons of World War II. Barnes & Nobel. 1998. 
 Chant, Chris. Artillery of World War II, Zenith Press, 2001, 
 McLean, Donald B. Japanese Artillery; Weapons and Tactics. Wickenburg, Ariz.: Normount Technical Publications 1973. .
 Mayer, S.L. The Rise and Fall of Imperial Japan. The Military Press (1884) 
 War Department Special Series No 25 Japanese Field Artillery October 1944
 US Department of War, TM 30-480, Handbook on Japanese Military Forces, Louisiana State University Press, 1994.

External links
Taki's Imperial Japanese Army
US Technical Manual E 30-480
75mm Type 94 mountain gun walkaround with extensive photos
75mm Type 94 mountain gun preserved in Vladivostok walkaround

World War II field artillery
75 mm artillery
9
Pack artillery
World War II mountain artillery
Military equipment introduced in the 1930s